Meloemorpha is a genus of beetles in the family Cerambycidae, containing the following species:

 Meloemorpha aliena (Bates, 1880)
 Meloemorpha anomala (Bates, 1885)

References

Lepturinae